Longwood is a historic home located at Gordonsville, Louisa County, Virginia. It was built about 1859, and is a two-story, three bay, frame dwelling in the Greek Revival style. It features a low-pitched hipped roof and two interior brick chimneys.  Also on the property is a contributing historic brick well.

It was listed on the National Register of Historic Places in 2002.

References

Houses on the National Register of Historic Places in Virginia
Greek Revival houses in Virginia
Houses completed in 1859
Houses in Louisa County, Virginia
National Register of Historic Places in Louisa County, Virginia